Thurmond can refer to:

People
Thurmond (surname), including a list of people with the name

Places
Thurmond, North Carolina
Thurmond, West Virginia
Thurmond (Amtrak station)

See also
Thurmond House (disambiguation)
Thurman (disambiguation)